Disciotis is a genus of fungi in the family Morchellaceae. Members of this family, characterized by their cup- or bowl-shaped apothecia, have a widespread distribution, especially in northern temperate regions.

Description

Disciotis has a cupulate (cup-shaped) pileus with vein-like hymenial folds and a small to non-existent stipe.

Species
The type species is Disciotis venosa, originally described as Peziza venosa by Christian Hendrik Persoon in 1801. Other species described in the genus include:

Disciotis ferruginascens Boud.
Disciotis maturescens Boud. (1891)
Disciotis rufescens R. Heim (1934)

It has been suggested that these species (and variants not listed above) all represent a single, morphologically variable species.

References

External links
Disciotis at Index Fungorum

Morchellaceae
Pezizales genera
Taxa named by Jean Louis Émile Boudier
Taxa described in 1885